Cucurbitane is a class of tetracyclic chemical compounds with formula  (CAS number 65441-59-0).  It is a polycyclic hydrocarbon, specifically triterpene.  It is also an isomer of lanostane (specifically 19(10→9β)-abeolanostane), from which it differs by the formal shift of a methyl group (carbon number 19) from the 10 to the 9β position in the standard steroid numbering scheme.

The name is applied to two stereoisomers, distinguished by the prefixes 5α- and 5β-, which differ by the handedness of the bonds at a particular carbon atom (number 5 in the standard steroid numbering scheme).

Derivatives

Natural compounds
Compounds with the basic cucurbitane skeleton are found in many plants, and some are important phytopharmaceuticals.  Natural cucurbitane-related compounds include:

Named
 Balsaminapentaol, from Momordica balsamina.
 Balsaminol A, from Momordica balsamina.
 Balsaminol B, from Momordica balsamina.
 Brydioside A from Bryonia dioica
 Bryoamaride and derivatives from Bryonia dioica
 Charantin or foetidin, from Momordica charantia and Momordica foetida
 Charantosides I-VIII, from Momordica charantia.
 Cucurbalsaminol B, from Momordica balsamina.
 Cucurbalsaminol A, from Momordica balsamina.
 Cucurbitacins A-L, O-T
 Datiscosides, from Datisca glomerata
 Endecaphyllacins A and B, from roots of Hemsleya endecaphylla
 Hemslecins A and B, from roots of H. endecaphylla
 Lepidolide, from the mushroom Russula lepida
 Karavilagenin E, from Momordica balsamina.
 Khekadaengosides A, B, D and K, from Trichosanthes tricuspidata
 Kuguacins A-S, from stems and leaves of Momordica charantia
 Kuguaglycosides A-H, from the root of Momordica charantia
 Mogrosides I-V, from the fruits of Siraitia grosvenorii
 Momordicin I, II and 28, from Momordica charantia
 Momordicines II and IV, from leaves of Momordica charantia
 Momordicosides A-S, from Momordica charantia fruits
 Neokuguaglucoside, from Momordica charantia fruits
 Neomogroside, from the fruit of Siraitia grosvenorii.
 Pentanorcucurbitacins A and B
 Perseapicroside A, from Persea mexicana
 Scandenoside R9, from Hemsleya panacis-scandens
 Spinosides A and B, from Desfontainia spinosa

Unnamed
 3β,7β,23ξ-trihydroxycucurbita-5,24-dien-19-al, soluble in chloroform, melts at 123−125 °C, from Momordica charantia, Momordica foetida.
 3β,7β,25-trihydroxycucurbita-5,23-dien-19-al, soluble in chloroform, melts at 188−191 °C, from Momordica charantia, Momordica foetida
 3β,7β-dihydroxy-25-methoxycucurbita-5,23-dien-19-al, soluble in chloroform, from Momordica charantia, Momordica foetida
 5β,19-epoxy-25-methoxycucurbita-6,23-dien-3β,19-diol, soluble in chloroform, melts at 182−184 °C, from Momordica foetida
 5β,19-epoxycucurbita-6,23-dien-3β,19,25-triol, soluble in chloroform, from Momordica foetida
 5β,19-epoxy-19-methoxycucurbita-6,23-dien-3β,25-diol, soluble in chloroform, melts at 102−104 °C, from Momordica charantia, Momordica foetida
 5β,19-epoxy-19,25-dimethoxycucurbita-6,23-dien-3β-ol, soluble in chloroform, from Momordica charantia, Momordica foetida
 5β,19-epoxy-25-methoxycucurbita-6,23-dien-3β-ol, soluble in chloroform, melts at 139−141 °C, from Momordica charantia, Momordica foetida
 23-O-β-allopyranosylecucurbita-5,24-dien-7α,3β,22(R),23(S)-tetraol 3-O-β-allopyranoside,, white powder soluble in methanol, from Momordica charantia fruit (10 mg/35 kg)
 23(R),24(S),25-trihydroxycucurbit-5-ene 3-O-{[β-glucopyranosyl(1→6)]-O-β-glucopyranosyl}-25-O-β-glucopyranoside, white powder soluble in methanol, from Momordica charantia fruit (10 mg/35 kg)
 2,16-dihydroxy-22,23,24,25,26,27-hexanorcucurbit-5-en-11,20-dione 2-O-β-D-glucopyranoside, soluble in ethanol, from Cucurbita pepo fruits (25 mg/15 kg)
 16-hydroxy-22,23,24,25,26,27-hexanorcucurbit-5-en-11,20-dione 3-O-α-L-rhamnopyranosyl-(1→2)-β-D-glucopyranoside, white powder, soluble in ethanol, from Cucurbita pepo fruits (12 mg/15 kg)
 7-methoxycucurbita-5,24-diene-3β,23(R)-diol, from Momordica balsamina
25,26,27-trinorcucurbit-5-ene-3,7,23-trione ,  white powder, soluble in methanol, from stems of Momordica charantia (6 mg/18 kg)

See also
 Goyaglicoside
 Karaviloside
 Momordenol, from Momordica charantia
 24(R)-stigmastan-3β,5α,6β-triol-25-ene 3-O-β-glucopyranoside, white powder, from Momordica charantia fruit (15 mg/35 kg)

References

{{Terpenes}

Lanostanes
Triterpenes